Netball Northern Territory is the governing body for netball in the Northern Territory. It is affiliated to Netball Australia. It is responsible for organizing and managing Territory Storm who have competed in the Australian Netball League. 
It is also responsible for organizing and managing Netball at the Arafura Games
and the NT Link Netball Championships as well as numerous other leagues and competitions for junior and youth teams.

History
Netball Northern Territory has been affiliated to Netball Australia since 1977.

Since 2019, Netball Northern Territory's headquarters have been based at Territory Netball Stadium.

Representative teams

Competitions
 Netball at the Arafura Games
 NT Link Netball Championships

Member Associations

References

External links
 Netball Northern Territory on Facebook
   Netball Northern Territory on Twitter
 Netball Northern Territory on Instagram

 
Northern
Sports governing bodies in the Northern Territory